The 2014 EurAsia Cup presented by DRB-HICOM was the first edition of the EurAsia Cup, a team golf event contested between teams representing Asia and Europe. It was held from 27–29 March at the Glenmarie Golf and Country Club in Shah Alam, Selangor, Malaysia. The match ended in a 10–10 tie and, under the rules of the inaugural event, the Cup was shared between the teams.

The event had a $4,000,000 purse; $300,000 to each member of the winning team and $100,000 to each member of the losing team.

Teams

The Asian team consisted of (a) the captain, (b) the leading four members on the final 2013 Asian Tour Order of Merit: Aphibarnrat (1), Lahiri (3), Rahman (4) and Bhullar (5) (c) the leading three members, not already entered, on the Official World Golf Ranking as published on 2 February 2014: Kim (70), Oda (76), Tanihara (101), (d) two captain's choices. Jaidee chose Fung and Marksaeng.

The European team consisted of (a) the leading four members on the final 2013 Race to Dubai: McDowell (4), Donaldson (5), Dubuisson (6) and Fernández-Castaño (7) (b) the leading four members, not already entered, on the Official World Golf Ranking as published on 2 February 2014: Bjørn (24), Gallacher (37), Jiménez (39) and Luiten (43), (c) the captain, (d) a captain's choice. Since Jiménez qualified through (b) he was able to choose a second member. He chose Larrazábal and Olesen.

Schedule
27 March (Thursday) Four-ball x 5
28 March (Friday) Foursomes x 5
29 March (Saturday) Singles x 10

Thursday's matches (four-ball)

Source:

Friday's matches (foursomes)

Source:

Saturday's matches (singles)

Source:

References

External links

European Tour coverage
Asian Tour coverage

EurAsia Cup
Golf tournaments in Malaysia
Eurasia Cup
EurAsia Cup
EurAsia Cup